Colin Leo Hanton (born 12 December 1938) is a British musician who is a drummer for The Quarrymen—the band which would later evolve into The Beatles. He also plays for the reformed version of the band.

Biography and career
Hanton was in an early line-up of the band from summer 1956 along with John Lennon, Eric Griffiths, Pete Shotton and Rod Davis, and stayed with the band through several line-up changes until January 1959 (by then, the group's members were Lennon, Hanton, Paul McCartney, George Harrison and John Lowe).

Hanton was working as an apprentice upholsterer when he was asked to join the nascent band, largely because he had recently purchased a new drum kit. Many of the band's early practice sessions took place in Hanton's parents' house. He left the Quarrymen after an argument with the rest of the band following a disastrous performance at the Speke Bus Depot Social Club in Wavertree on 1 January 1959.

In 1997, Hanton joined the revived Quarrymen with other original members: Rod Davis, Len Garry, Pete Shotton (who retired from the band before his death in 2017) and Eric Griffiths, who died in 2005. John "Duff" Lowe, original Quarrymen pianist, also plays with the group occasionally.

References

External links
Original Quarrymen: Colin Hanton

1938 births
Living people
English rock drummers
Musicians from Liverpool
The Quarrymen members